Viktor Fedorovych Yanukovych (born 9 July 1950) is a former politician who served as the fourth president of Ukraine from 2010 until he was removed from office in the Revolution of Dignity in 2014, after months of protests against his presidency. From 2006 to 2007 he was the prime minister of Ukraine; he also served in this post from November 2002 to January 2005, with a short interruption in December 2004. He currently lives in exile in Russia, where he has lived since his removal from office in 2014.

Yanukovych served as the governor of Donetsk Oblast, a province in eastern Ukraine, from 1997 to 2002. He was Prime Minister of Ukraine from 21 November 2002 to 7 December 2004 and from 28 December 2004 to 5 January 2005, under President Leonid Kuchma. Yanukovych first ran for president in 2004: he advanced to the runoff election and was initially declared the winner against former Prime Minister Viktor Yushchenko. However, the election was fraught with allegations of electoral fraud and voter intimidation. This caused widespread citizen protests and Kyiv's Independence Square was occupied in what became known as the Orange Revolution. The Ukrainian Supreme Court nullified the runoff election and ordered a second runoff. Yanukovych lost this second election to Yushchenko. He served as Prime Minister for a second time from 4 August 2006 to 18 December 2007, under President Yushchenko.

Yanukovych was elected president in 2010, defeating Prime Minister Yulia Tymoshenko. The election was judged free and fair by international observers. In November 2013, a series of events started that led to his ousting as president. Amid pressure from Russia, Yanukovych suddenly changed his mind and rejected a pending association agreement with the EU, instead choosing to pursue closer ties with Russia and a Russian loan bailout. This sparked large protests by supporters of European integration, who occupied Kyiv's Independence Square and held rallies throughout Ukraine, in a wave of civil unrest dubbed the "Euromaidan". In January 2014, this developed into deadly clashes in Kyiv between protesters and Berkut special riot police. There was severe violence in Kyiv on 18–20 February, when police snipers fired on protesters, killing almost 100. On 21 February, Yanukovych and the parliamentary opposition signed an agreement to bring about an interim unity government, constitutional reforms and early elections. Later that day, however, he secretly fled the capital for Kharkiv, claiming his car was shot at as he left Kyiv, and travelling next to Crimea, and eventually to exile in Russia.

On 22 February 2014, the Ukrainian parliament voted to remove him from his post and schedule early elections on the grounds that he had withdrawn from his constitutional duties, rather than through the impeachment process. Two days later, the interim government issued a warrant for his arrest, accusing him of responsibility for "mass killing of civilians". After his departure, Yanukovych held several press conferences, and declared himself to remain "the legitimate head of the Ukrainian state elected in a free vote by Ukrainian citizens". On 18 June 2015, Yanukovych was officially deprived of the title of president by parliament. On 24 January 2019, he was sentenced in absentia to thirteen years' imprisonment for high treason by a Ukrainian court.

In social polls conducted since his departure from office, Yanukovych is regarded as the worst president in Ukrainian history. Yanukovych has also given his name to a collective term of different blunders made by Ukrainian politicians now called Yanukisms.

Early life and early career
Viktor Yanukovych was born in the village of Zhukovka near Yenakiieve in Donetsk Oblast, Ukrainian SSR, Soviet Union. He endured a very hard childhood about which he has stated: "My childhood was difficult and hungry. I grew up without my mother, who died when I was two. I went around bare-footed on the streets. I had to fight for myself every day.

Yanukovych is of Russian, Polish and Belarusian descent. Yanukovych is a surname of Belarusian origin, Yanuk being a derivative of the Catholic name Yan ("John"). His mother was a Russian nurse and his father, Fyodor Yanukovych, was a Polish-Belarusian locomotive-driver, originally from Yanuki in the Dokshytsy Raion of the Vitebsk Region which is in present-day Belarus. On various occasions, Yanukovych's family has been dogged by accusations that Fyodor Yanukovych was a member of the Schutzmannschaft during World War II, in particular claims by members of the Yulia Tymoshenko Bloc, which included documents from the NKVD supposedly revealing his involvement with the Schutzmannschaft. However, it has also been stated by residents of Yanuki that Yanukovych's family left for the Donbas before 1917, and that the collaborator Fyodor Yanukovych was an unrelated individual. Others, particularly members of the Party of Regions, have claimed that the documents were a falsehood with the intention of disparaging Yanukovych ahead of elections.

By the time he was a teenager, Yanukovych's father had remarried. However, Viktor left home due to conflicts with his stepmother, and was brought up by his Polish paternal grandmother, originally from Warsaw. His grandfather and great-grandparents were Lithuanian-Poles. Yanukovych has half-sisters from his father's remarriage, but has no contact with them.

On 15 December 1967, at the age of 17, Yanukovych was sentenced to three years imprisonment for participating in a robbery and assault. On 8 June 1970 he was convicted for a second time on charges of assault. He was sentenced to two years of imprisonment and did not appeal the verdict. Decades later, Yanukovych characterised his arrests and imprisonment as "mistakes of youth".

In 1971, Yanukovych married Lyudmyla Nastenko a niece of Yenakiyeve city judge Oleksandr Sazhyn.

In July 1974, Yanukovych enrolled at the Donetsk Polytechnic Institute. In 1976, as a second-year student, he was promoted to director of a small trucking division within the Ordzhonikidzeugol coal-mining company. His appointment as the chief manager marked the start of his managerial career as a regional transport executive. He held various positions in transport companies in Yenakiieve and Donetsk until 1996.

Political career: 1996–2010
Yanukovych's political career began when he was appointed as a Vice-Head of Donetsk Oblast Administration in August 1996. On 14 May 1997, he was appointed as the Head of the Administration (i.e. Governor).

Prime Minister (2002–2004)
President Leonid Kuchma appointed Yanukovych to the post of Prime Minister following Anatoliy Kinakh's resignation. Yanukovych began his term as Prime Minister on 21 November 2002 following a 234-vote confirmation in the Verkhovna Rada, eight more than needed.

In foreign affairs, Yanukovych's cabinet was considered to be politically close to Russia, although declaring support for Ukrainian membership in the European Union. Although Yanukovych's parliamentary coalition was not supporting Ukrainian membership in the North Atlantic Treaty Organization (NATO), his cabinet agreed to the commission of Ukrainian troops to the Iraq War in support of the United States' War on Terrorism.

2004 presidential campaign

In 2004, as the Prime Minister, Yanukovych participated in the controversial Ukrainian presidential election as the Party of Regions candidate. Yanukovych's main base of support emerged from the southern and eastern regions of Ukraine, which favor close ties with neighbouring Russia. In the first round of voting held on 31 October 2004, Yanukovych took second place with 39.3 percent of the votes to opposition leader Viktor Yuschenko with 39.8 percent. Because no candidate passed the 50 percent threshold, a second round of voting was scheduled.

In the second round of the election, Yanukovych was initially declared the winner. However, the legitimacy of the election was questioned by many Ukrainians, international organizations, and foreign governments following allegations of electoral fraud. The resulting widespread protests became known as the Orange Revolution. The second round of the election was subsequently annulled by the Supreme Court of Ukraine, and in the repeated run-off, Yanukovych lost to Yushchenko with 44.2 percent to Yushchenko's 51.9 percent.

After the election, the Ukrainian parliament passed a non-binding motion of no confidence in Yanukovych's government, urging outgoing President Leonid Kuchma to dismiss Yanukovych and appoint a caretaker government. Five days after his electoral defeat, Yanukovych declared his resignation from the post of Prime Minister. In November 2009 Yanukovych stated that he conceded defeat only to avoid violence. "I didn't want mothers to lose their children and wives their husbands. I didn't want dead bodies from Kyiv to flow down the Dnipro. I didn't want to assume power through bloodshed."

After the Orange Revolution
Following his electoral defeat in 2004, Yanukovych led the main opposition party against the Tymoshenko government made up of Yushchenko's Our Ukraine, the Yulia Tymoshenko Bloc, and Oleksandr Moroz's Socialist Party. This government was marred by growing conflict between Yushchenko and Tymoshenko. Yanukovych's Party of Regions support allowed for the establishment of Yuriy Yekhanurov's government in late 2005. 

In October 2004, Ukrainian deputy Hryhory Omelchenko accused Yanukovych of having been a member of "a group of individuals who brutally beat and raped a woman, but bought off the victim and the criminal case was closed". The press-service of the Ukrainian Cabinet asserted that Yanukovych suffered for the attempt to defend a girl from hooligans.

In 2005, the Party of Regions signed a collaboration agreement with the Russian political party United Russia. In 2008, Yanukovych spoke at a congress of the United Russia party.

2006–2007 elections and second premiership

In January 2006, the Ministry of Internal Affairs of Ukraine started an official investigation of the allegedly false acquittal of the criminal convictions which Yanukovych received in his youth. Yuriy Lutsenko, the head of the ministry, announced that forensic tests proved the forgery of the respective documents (issued in instead of 1978) and initially claimed that lack of the formal acquittal precluded Yanukovych from running for the seat in the 2006 parliamentary election.

However, the latter statement was corrected within days by Lutsenko himself who conceded that the outcome of the investigation into the legality of the Yanukovych's acquittal could not affect his eligibility to run for the parliament seat since the deprivation of his civil rights due to the past convictions would have expired anyway due to the statute of limitations. Viktor Yanukovych's Party of Regions won the 2006 Ukrainian parliamentary election.

In 2006, a criminal charge was made for the falsification of documents regarding the retraction of Yanukovych's prior conviction. According to Rossiyskaya Gazeta two documents had been forged regarding Yanukovych's robbery in association with rape and assault and battery. The signature of the judge for these documents in Yanukovych's retraction was also forged.

On 25 May 2007, Viktor Yanukovych was assigned the post of appointed chairman of the Government Chiefs Council of the Commonwealth of Independent States.

Presidential campaign and election

In 2009, Yanukovych announced his intent to run for president in the then upcoming presidential election. He was endorsed by the Party of Regions and the Youth Party of Ukraine.

Minister of Internal Affairs Yuriy Lutsenko accused Yanukovych of financial fraud during the campaign. Yanukovych's campaign was expected to have cost $100 to $150 million.

On 11 December 2009, Yanukovych called for his supporters to go to Maidan Nezalezhnosti, Kyiv's Independence Square, in case of election fraud.

Early vote returns from the first round of the election held on 17 January showed Yanukovych in first place with 35.8% of the vote. He faced a 7 February 2010 runoff against Tymoshenko, who finished second (with 24.7% of the vote). After all ballots were counted, the Ukrainian Central Election Commission declared that Yanukovych won the runoff election with 48.95% of the vote compared with 45.47% for Tymoshenko. Election observers from the Organisation for Security and Co-operation in Europe (OSCE) said there were no indications of serious fraud and described the vote as an "impressive display" of democracy.   Tymoshenko withdrew her subsequent legal challenge of the result. Tad Devine, an associate of Rick Gates and Paul Manafort, wrote Yanukovych's victory speech.

Presidency (2010–2014)

Inauguration
Ukraine's parliament had (on 16 February) fixed 25 February 2010 for the inauguration of Yanukovych as president. Ukrainian President Viktor Yushchenko signed a decree endorsing a plan of events related to Yanukovych's inauguration on 20 February 2010. Yushchenko also congratulated and wished Yanukovych "to defend Ukrainian interests and democratic traditions" at the presidential post.

Patriarch Kirill of Moscow and All Rus at Yanukovych's invitation conducted a public prayer service at Kyiv Pechersk Lavra before Yanukovych's presidential inauguration. Patriarch Kirill also attended the inauguration along with High Representative of the Union for Foreign Affairs and Security Policy Catherine Ashton, United States National Security Advisor James Jones and speaker of the Russian parliament Boris Gryzlov.

Yanukovych's immediate predecessor, Yushchenko, did not attend the ceremony, nor did the Prime Minister, Yulia Tymoshenko, and her party, Bloc Yulia Tymoshenko.

First days
On 3 March 2010, Yanukovych suspended his membership in the Party of Regions as he was barred by the Constitution from heading a political party while president, and handed over leadership in the party and its parliamentary faction to Mykola Azarov.

On new alliances
Yanukovych said, "Ukraine's integration with the EU remains our strategic aim", with a "balanced policy, which will protect our national interests both on our eastern border – I mean with Russia – and of course with the European Union". According to Yanukovych, Ukraine must be a "neutral state" which should be part of a "collective defence system which the European Union, NATO and Russia will take part in." Yanukovych wants Ukraine to "neither join NATO nor the CSTO". He stated on 7 January 2010 that Ukraine is ready to consider an initiative by Dmitry Medvedev on the creation of a new Europe collective security system stating "And we're ready to back Russia's and France's initiatives".

Yanukovych stated during the 2010 presidential election-campaign that the current level of Ukraine's cooperation with NATO was sufficient and that the question of the country's accession to the alliance was therefore not urgent. "The Ukrainian people don't currently support Ukraine's entry to NATO and this corresponds to the status that we currently have. We don't want to join any military bloc". On 27 May 2010 President Yanukovych stated he considered Ukraine's relations with NATO as a partnership, "And Ukraine can't live without this [partnership], because Ukraine is a large country".

In early November 2011, Yanukovych claimed that "arms are being bought in the country and armed attacks on government agencies are being prepared." These claims were met with disbelief.

2012 presidential predictions
For 2012 Yanukovych predicted "social standards will continue to grow" and "improvement of administrative services system will continue". Yanukovich announced $2 billion worth of pension and other welfare increases on 7 March 2012.

Constitutional assembly
In May 2012, Yanukovych set up the Constitutional Assembly of Ukraine, a special auxiliary agency under the President for drawing up bills of amendments to the Constitution of Ukraine; the President then can table them in parliament.

Domestic policy

Amid controversy Ukrainian lawmakers formed a new coalition on 11 March 2010 which included Bloc Lytvyn, Communist Party of Ukraine and Party of Regions that led to the Azarov Government. 235 deputies from the 450-member parliament signed the coalition agreement.

Presidential powers
On 25 June 2010, President Yanukovych criticised 2004 amendments in the Ukrainian Constitution which weakened presidential powers such as control over naming government ministers, passing those functions to parliament.

During the 2011 World Economic Forum, Yanukovych called Ukraine "one of the leaders on democratic development in Eastern Europe".

Financial policy

Tax code
On 30 November 2010, Yanukovych vetoed a new tax code made by the Azarov Government and earlier approved by the Verkhovna Rada but protested against in rallies across Ukraine (one of the largest protests since the 2004 Orange Revolution). Yanukovych signed a new tax code on 3 December 2010.

Domestic spending vs. debt
Yanukovych's Party of Regions wanted to increase social benefits, and raise salaries and pensions. In late 2009, a law that raised the minimum wage and pensions was passed in the Ukrainian Parliament. As a result of this, the International Monetary Fund suspended its 2008–2009 Ukrainian financial crisis emergency lending programme. According to the IMF, the law breached promises to control spending. During the 2010 presidential campaign, Yanukovych had stated he would stand by this particular law.

According to Yulia Tymoshenko Bloc member of parliament Oleh Shevchuk, Yanukovych broke this election promise just three days after the 2010 presidential election when only two lawmakers of Yanukovych's Party of Regions supported a bill to raise pensions for low-incomes.

Energy policy

Russian gas
According to Yanukovych, relations between Ukraine and Russia in the gas sector were to be built "according to the rules of the market". He saw the gas agreement signed in 2009 after the 2009 Russia-Ukraine gas dispute as very unprofitable for Ukraine and wanted to "initiate the discussion of the most urgent gas issues" after the 2010 presidential election. Yanukovych had promised before his election as Ukrainian President to "solve the issue" concerning the Russian Black Sea Fleet, currently stationed in the Ukrainian port Sevastopol, "in a way so that the interests of Russia or Ukraine would not be harmed".

This led to the April 2010 Ukrainian–Russian Naval Base for Natural Gas treaty. Yanukovych also promised to create a consortium that would allow Russia to jointly operate Ukraine's gas transportation network and he has pledged to help Russia build the South Stream natural gas pipeline. As of June 2010, both did not happen.

Yanukovych rejected accusations that improvement of Ukrainian-Russian relations harmed relations with the European Union. "Our policy is directed to protection of our national interests. We do not live in a fairy tale and understand that our partners also defend their interests". In February 2012, Yanukovych stated, referring to relations with Russia, "It is not wise to fall asleep next to a big bear".

Downgrading uranium stock

During the 2010 Nuclear Security Summit, Yanukovych announced that Ukraine would give up its 90-kilogram stock of highly enriched uranium and convert its research reactors from highly enriched to low-enriched uranium. It intended to accomplish these goals by 2012.

Cultural policy

East/West Ukraine unification
Yanukovych stated that his "aim and dream" was to unify Ukraine, although in his opinion "there are already no borders between the East and West of the country today". Yanukovych said he wanted to create a free trade zone and visa regime with the EU as soon as possible. He noted the importance of finding ways of reconciliation between Ukrainians fighting on opposite sides in World War II in his speech at the ceremony to mark Victory Day 2013. In this speech he also expressed confidence that Nazi and Soviet totalitarianism of the past would never return.

Holodomor

The Soviet famine of 1932–33, called "Holodomor" in Ukrainian, claimed up to 10 million lives, mostly in Ukraine but also in some other parts of the Soviet Union, as peasants' food stocks were forcibly removed by Stalin's regime via the NKVD secret police.

Yanukovych's stance on the Holodomor was: "Holodomor took place, was denounced and the international society gave an evaluation of the famine, but it was never labeled as a genocide of the Ukrainian people. Ukraine's attempts to do so by blaming one of our neighbors are unjust." "The Holodomor was in Ukraine, Russia, Belarus and Kazakhstan. It was the result of the policies of Stalin's totalitarian regime." In 2003, he supported then President Leonid Kuchma's position that the Holodomor famine was genocide against Ukrainians.

Yanukovych's press service claims that he does not approve of crimes of the KGB and their predecessors in Soviet times, however, in 2002, he wrote a foreword to a book by two ex-KGB agents endorsing the KGB and its predecessors, stating that the NKVD and Cheka "firmly stood on guard over the interests of our people and the state" and praised them for launching "a struggle against political extremism, sabotage and criminal activities." He also wrote that “Donbas Chekists under any conditions have done and do their high duty with honor”.

Russian as an official language

Yanukovych stated in the past that he wanted Russian to become the second state language in Ukraine. Currently Ukrainian is the only official language of Ukraine. On the other hand, he stated at a meeting with Taras Shevchenko National Prize winners in Kyiv on 9 March 2010 that "Ukraine will continue to promote the Ukrainian language as its only state language".

In a newspaper interview during the 2010 Ukrainian presidential election campaign, he stated that the status of Russian in Ukraine "is too politicized" and said that if elected president in 2010 he would "have a real opportunity to adopt a law on languages, which implements the requirements of the European Charter of regional languages". He said that this law would need 226 votes in the Ukrainian parliament (half of the votes instead of two-thirds of the votes needed to change the constitution of Ukraine) and that voters told him that the current status of Russian in Ukraine created "problems in the hospital, school, university, in the courts, in the office".

Effective in August 2012, a new law on regional languages entitles any local language spoken by at least a 10% minority be declared official within that area. On 23 February 2014, following the Revolution of Dignity, a bill was passed by the parliament which would have abolished the law on regional languages, making Ukrainian the sole state language at all levels. This bill was blocked by acting President Turchynov, until a replacement bill is ready. The 2012 law was ruled unconstitutional and was struck down by the Constitutional Court of Ukraine in 2018, 4 years after the Euromaidan.

Religion
In a late July 2013 speech Yanukovych stated: "All churches and religious organizations are equal for the state. We respect the choice of our citizens and guarantee everyone's Constitutional right to freedom of religion. We will not allow the use of churches and religious organizations by some political forces for their narrow interests. This also refers to foreign centres through which religious organizations sometimes seek to affect the internal political situation in Ukraine. This is a matter of the state's national security".

Social policy
Social benefit cuts for Chernobyl rescue workers, small business owners and veterans of the Soviet–Afghan War caused fierce protests in Kyiv in October/November 2011 by several thousand protesters.

Foreign policy

Yanukovych's first foreign visit was to Brussels to visit the President of the European Council, Herman Van Rompuy, and the EU Foreign Affairs chief, Catherine Ashton. During the visit Yanukovych stated that there would be no change to Ukraine's status as a member of the NATO outreach program.

During his second foreign visit to Moscow in March, Yanukovych vowed to end years of acrimony with Russia, saying that ties between Russia and Ukraine "should never be the way they were for the past five years". He indicated that he was open to compromise with Russia on the Black Sea Fleet's future (this led to the April 2010 Ukrainian–Russian Naval Base for Natural Gas treaty), and reiterated that Ukraine would remain a "European, non-aligned state", referring to NATO membership. Both Russian President Dmitry Medvedev (April 2010) and Russian Prime Minister Vladimir Putin (June 2010) soon stated they noticed a big improvement in relations with Ukraine since Yanukovych's presidency.

On 3 June 2010, the Ukrainian parliament excluded, in a bill written by Yanukovych, with 226 votes, Ukrainian membership of any military bloc, but allowed for co-operation with military alliances such as NATO. A day later Yanukovych stated that the recognition of the independence of Abkhazia, South Ossetia and Kosovo violates international law, "I have never recognized Abkhazia, South Ossetia or Kosovo's independence. This is a violation of international law".

On 22 November 2010, the European Council and Ukraine announced "an action plan for Ukraine toward the establishment of a visa-free regime for short-stay travel". In May 2011, Yanukovych stated that he would strive for Ukraine to join the EU. Yanukovych's stance towards integration with the EU, according to The Economist, led him to be "seen in Moscow as a traitor", a reversal of the 2004 presidential election where Moscow openly supported Yanukovych.

Crimean naval base

On 21 April 2010, in Kharkiv, Yanukovych and Dmitry Medvedev, the Russian President, signed the 2010 Ukrainian–Russian Naval Base for Natural Gas treaty, whereby the Russian lease on naval facilities in Crimea would be extended beyond 2017 by 25 years with an additional 5-year renewal option (to 2042–47) in exchange for a multi-year discounted contract to provide Ukraine with Russian natural gas. This treaty was approved by both the Russian and Ukrainian parliaments (Verkhovna Rada) on 27 April 2010.

On 22 April 2010, Yanukovych stated he did not rule out the possibility of holding a referendum on the stationing of the Russian Black Sea Fleet in Ukraine after the necessary legislative framework is adopted for this in future. Yanukovych did plan to hold plebiscites also on other subjects. Opposition members accused Yanukovych of "selling out national interests".

According to Yanukovych the main priority of his foreign policy was to integrate Ukraine "into the European mainstream", while improving relations with Russia. According to Yanukovych the only way to lower the state budget deficit, as requested by the International Monetary Fund, while protecting pensioners and minimal wages was to extend the Russian Navy lease in Crimea in exchange for cheaper natural gas.

2012 parliamentary elections

In 2012, during the Ukrainian parliamentary elections of that year, Yanukovych's party of Regions won the poll with 30% against 25.5% for imprisoned Yulia Tymoshenko's Fatherland party.

Criticism of his presidency

Alleged attempt to remove opposition
President Yanukovych and the Party of Regions were accused of trying to create a "controlled democracy" in Ukraine and as a means to this were trying to "destroy" main opposition party BYuT, but both denied these charges. One frequently cited example of Yanukovych's attempts to centralize power is the 2011 sentencing of Yulia Tymoshenko, which was condemned by Western governments as potentially being politically motivated. Other high-profile political opponents under criminal investigation include Leonid Kuchma, Bogdan Danilishin, Igor Didenko, Anatoliy Makarenko, and Valeriy Ivaschenko.

According to Yanukovych (on 4 February 2011), "[M]any lies [have been] told and attempts made to misinform the international community and ordinary people in Ukraine about the true state of affairs in the country." He also stated, "[A] crushing blow delivered under [my] rule to corruption and bureaucracy has been met with resistance". He stated in February 2012 that the trial of Tymoshenko and other former officials "didn't meet European standards and principles".

Press censorship allegation

As president, Yanukovych stated in early February 2010 that he would support the freedom of speech of journalists and protect their interests. During spring 2010 Ukrainian journalists and Reporters Without Borders complained of censorship by Yanukovych's Presidential Administration; despite statements by Yanukovych how deeply he valued press freedom and that 'free, independent media that must ensure society's unimpeded access to information.'

Anonymous journalists stated early May 2010 that they were voluntarily tailoring their coverage so as not to offend the Yanukovych administration and the Azarov Government. The Azarov Government, the Presidential Administration and Yanukovych himself denied being involved with censorship. In a press conference 12 May 2010 President Yanukovych's representative in the Verkhovna Rada Yury Miroshnychenko stated that Yanukovych was against political repression for criticism of the regime.

Reports of corruption and cronyism
Yanukovych has been widely criticized for "massive" corruption and cronyism.

By January 2013, more than half of the ministers appointed by Yanukovych were either born in the Donbas region or made some crucial part of their careers there, and Yanukovych has been accused of "regional cronyism" for his staffing of police, judiciary, and tax services "all over Ukraine" with "Donbas people". Over 46% of the budget subventions for social and economic development was allotted to the Donbas region's Donetsk Oblast and Luhansk Oblast administrations – 0.62 billion UAH ($76.2 million) versus 0.71 billion UAH ($87.5 million) for the rest of the country.

Anders Åslund, a Swedish economist and Ukraine analyst, described the consolidation of Ukrainian economic power in the hands of a few "elite industrial tycoons", one of the richest and most influential of whom has become President Yanukovych's own son Oleksandr Yanukovych. The exact distribution of wealth and precise weight of influence are difficult to gauge, but most of the country's richest men were afraid to cross the Yanukovich family, even in cases where their own economic interests favored an economically pro-EU Ukraine.

The Yanukovych family, a group of young businessmen described as "robber capitalists", have been buying up both public and private businesses at "rock bottom" prices available in the stagnating economic conditions brought on by Yanukovych's economic policies." According to Åslund, one notable exception to the Yanukovych family's influence was Petro Poroshenko, who is described as "uncommonly courageous", although his confectionery empire is less susceptible to ruin by the substantial power the Yanukovych family wielded in the heavy industry sectors located in Yanukovych's geographic power base of Donetsk.

Yanukovych had an estimated net worth of $12 billion, and has been accused by Ukrainian officials of misappropriating funds from Ukraine's treasury. Arseniy Yatsenyuk has claimed that treasury funds of up to $70 billion were transferred to foreign accounts during Yanukovych's presidency.
 Authorities in Switzerland, Austria and Liechtenstein froze the assets of Yanukovych and his son Oleksander on 28 February 2014 pending a money laundering investigation. Yanukovych has denied that he embezzled funds and has said that his alleged foreign accounts do not exist.

During the presidency of Viktor Yanukovych, at least 7,000 Ukrainian companies were attacked by the oligarchic clan of Yanukovych (the so-called "Yanukovych Families"). This number includes both cases of the so-called Family entering the corporate rights of the firms they like by illegal methods, and "assaults" in order to obtain "tribute" – that is, commercial gain. This is evidenced by the data of the Anti-Raider Union of Entrepreneurs of Ukraine. The victims of Yanukovych's raider methods were offered to pay a regular "tribute" in the amount of 30–50% of the company's profits – or to cede ownership of it.

Personal excesses
Yanukovych abandoned his large estate, Mezhyhirya when he fled the capital. The estate is located in a former forest preserve on the outskirts of Kyiv.

He had acquired the property in 2007, according to critics, through a convoluted series of companies and transactions. Yanukovych did not reveal the price he paid, although he called it a "very serious price". Mezhyhirya is estimated to have been sold for more than 75 million U.S. dollars.

In a feature with photos on Yanukovych's Mezhyhirya mansion, Sergii Leshchenko notes "For most of [Yanukovych's] career he was a public servant or parliament deputy, where his salary never exceeded 2000 US dollars per month." Under a photo showing the new home's ornate ceiling, Leschenko remarks, "In a country where 35% of the population live under poverty line, spending 100,000 dollars on each individual chandelier seems excessive, to say the least." Crowned with a pure copper roof, the mansion was the largest wooden structure ever created by Finnish log home builder Honka, whose representative suggested to Yanukovych that it be nominated for the Guinness Book of Records.

The property contained a private zoo, underground shooting range, 18-hole golf course, tennis, and bowling. After describing the mansion's complicated ownership scheme, the article author noted, "The story of Viktor Yanukovych and his residence highlights a paradox. Having completely rejected such European values as human rights and democracy, the Ukrainian president uses Europe as a place to hide his dirty money with impunity."

Documents recovered from Yanukovych's compound show among other expenses $800 medical treatment for fish, $14,500 spent on tablecloths, and a nearly 42 million dollar order for light fixtures. Also recovered were files on Yanukovych's perceived enemies, especially media members, including beating victim Tetyana Chornovol. The cost of monitoring the mass media was reportedly $5.7 million just for the month of December 2010.

When the former president departed, 35 cars and seven motorbikes were left behind. Kyiv's District Court seized 27 vintage cars in 2016 from the fleet stationed at Mezhyhirya, some worth more than $US 1 million.

Yanukovych told BBC Newsnight (in June 2015) that stories that Mezhyhirya cost the Ukrainian taxpayer millions of dollars were "political technology and spin" and that the estate did not belong to him personally; he claimed that the ostriches in the residence's petting zoo "just happened to be there" and remarked "I supported the ostriches, what’s wrong with that?".

Vote rigging allegations
The Organization for Security and Cooperation in Europe confirmed witness accounts of voters being blocked from access to polls and being attacked along with local election officials who tried to frustrate the Berkut's practice of falsifying voters' ballots in favor of Yanukovych's Party of Regions candidates. Individual cases have been reported of citizens grouping together and fighting back against the Berkut in order to preserve election integrity and results. Upon coming to power Yanukovych had reversed oversight measures established during the Yushchenko administration to restrain the Berkut's abuse of citizens whereupon the special force "upped its brutality."

Euromaidan protests

Since 2012, Ukraine and the EU had been negotiating a free trade and association agreement. In 2013, the Verkhovna Rada (Ukrainian parliament) overwhelmingly approved finalizing the agreement with the EU, and Yanukovych urged parliament to adopt laws so that Ukraine would meet the EU's criteria and be able to sign the agreement in November 2013. Russia, however, put pressure on Ukraine to reject the agreement.

On 21 November 2013, Yanukovych abruptly changed his mind on the Association Agreement with the EU, instead deciding to strengthen economic ties with Russia. This sparked large protests at Independence Square (Maidan Nezalezhnosti) in the center of Kyiv, which became known as 'Euromaidan'. The protesters, united under the Maidan People's Union, demanded Yanukovych fulfill his pledge to sign the Agreement or else resign. They also called for a return to the 2004 Constitution of Ukraine to give more power to parliament over the president. The scope of the protests soon widened. Protesters opposed what they saw as widespread government corruption, abuse of power, human rights violations, and the influence of oligarchs. 

During the 'Maidan uprising', Independence Square was a huge protest camp occupied by thousands of protesters and protected by makeshift barricades. It had kitchens, first aid posts and broadcasting facilities, as well as stages for speeches, lectures, debates and performances. Police assaulted the camp several times, causing further anger.

Yanukovych has been accused, by Amnesty International among others, of using the Berkut to threaten, attack, and torture protesters. The Berkut, later disbanded on 25 February 2014, were a special police force under his personal command and were accused of defending Russian interests.

Violence escalated after 16 January 2014, when Yanukovych signed draconian Anti-Protest Laws. The first protesters were killed in fierce clashes with police on Hrushevsky Street on 19–22 January. In response, demonstrators occupied provincial government buildings in many regions of Ukraine. On 28 January, parliament repealed nine of the 12 restrictive laws. That day, Mykola Azarov, the prime minister of Ukraine, resigned "for the sake of a peaceful resolution" to the civil unrest.

The deadliest clashes were on 18–20 February, which saw the most severe violence in Ukraine since it regained independence. Thousands of protesters advanced from the Maidan in Kyiv towards parliament, led by activists with shields and helmets. They were fired on by police snipers. Almost 100 protesters were killed, as were 13 police officers.

In June 2015 interview with BBC Newsnight Yanukovych stated that he never ordered the security forces to open fire, but he also said he had not done enough to prevent bloodshed. He said "the members of the security forces fulfilled their duties according to existing laws. They had the right to use weapons."

Removal from presidency

On Friday 21 February 2014, Yanukovych and the leaders of the parliamentary opposition signed an agreement to bring about an interim unity government, constitutional reforms and early elections. That day, the Ukrainian parliament (Verkhovna Rada) voted 386–0 to reinstate the 2004 Constitution of Ukraine. During the afternoon, police abandoned central Kyiv, allowing protesters to take control. Yanukovych secretly fled the city that evening. 

On Saturday 22 February, Yanukovych could not be found, and parliament were not informed of his whereabouts. Parliament held an emergency session. The Chairman of parliament, Volodymyr Rybak, resigned that morning. Parliament then elected Oleksandr Turchynov as Chairman. Under the 2004 Constitution, which parliament had voted to reinstate, the President's powers would transfer to the Chairman if the President should resign or be unable to fulfill his duties. The former constitution had stated the President's powers would transfer to the Prime Minister. The acting Prime Minister, Serhiy Arbuzov, was also missing.

In the afternoon, the Rada voted 328–0 (about 73% of its 447 members) to remove Yanukovych from his post and to schedule an early presidential election for 25 May. The resolution stated that Yanukovych had withdrawn from fulfilling his constitutional duties, "which threatens the governance of the state, the territorial integrity and sovereignty of Ukraine", and cited "circumstances of extreme urgency". The resolution to remove Yanukovych was supported by all opposition parties: 86 deputies of Batkivshchyna (Fatherland Party), 41 deputies of the Ukrainian Democratic Alliance for Reform (UDAR), 36 deputies of Svoboda (Freedom Party), 30 deputies of the Communist Party, as well as 99 independents. Furthermore, 36 deputies of Yanukovych's Party of Regions voted for his removal. There were no votes against. Of the remaining deputies, 115 were absent and 6 did not vote. Under the 2004 constitution, parliament chairman Turchynov became acting President.

The vote came an hour after Yanukovych said in a televised address that he would not resign. He subsequently declared himself to still be "the legitimate head of the Ukrainian state elected in a free vote by Ukrainian citizens", and maintained that his removal was a coup d'état.

The constitutionality of Yanukovych's removal from office has been questioned by constitutional experts. Parliament did not vote to impeach the President, which would have involved formally charging Yanukovych with a crime, a review of the charge by the Constitutional Court of Ukraine, and a three-fourths majority vote in parliament—at least 338 votes in favor. The Ukrainian Constitution at this time (like many other constitutions) did not provide any stipulation about how to remove a president who is neither dead nor incapacitated, but is nonetheless absent or not fulfilling his duties. The lack of such provisions was a loophole. Viktor Yanukovych fled from Ukraine to Russia. The title of the resolution was «Resolution of the Verkhovna Rada of Ukraine. On self-removal of the President of Ukraine from the exercise of constitutional powers and appointment of extraordinary elections of the President of Ukraine».

On the same day that parliament removed Yanukovych from office, it voted to authorize the release of his rival Yulia Tymoshenko from a prison hospital. She had been imprisoned since 2011, in what many saw as political payback by Yanukovych. Her release had been an unmet condition for Ukraine's signing of a European Union trade pact.

Two days later, Ukraine's parliament dismissed five judges of the Constitutional Court for allegedly violating their oaths, who were then investigated for alleged malpractice.

Disavowal by party
Yanukovych was soon disowned by the Party of Regions. In a statement issued by Oleksandr Yefremov, parliamentary faction leader, the party and its members "strongly condemn[ed] the criminal orders that led to human victims, an empty state treasury, huge debts, shame before the eyes of the Ukrainian people and the entire world."

Fleeing to Russia 
Yanukovych left Kyiv during the night of 21–22 February 2014 and initially moved to Kharkiv. According to then governor of Kharkiv Oblast, Mykhailo Dobkin, Yanukovych had intended to make his stay in Kharkiv look like "just another presidential inspection tour" and according to Dobkin, "was desperate to make it look like he wasn't running away". Yanukovych asked Dobkin to "pick out a few factories for me to visit"; the director of state-owned industrial giant Turboatom declined even to take his call (according to Dobkin). Dobkin met Yanukovych at Kharkiv International Airport after midnight. According to Dobkin at that time Yanukovych "thought this was a temporary difficulty" since he believed that the 21 February agreement could still provide for a graceful departure from office later in the year. Dobkin's impression of Yanukovych (during this meeting) was "a guy on another planet".

In a press conference several days after leaving Kyiv, Yanukovych claimed that at the time he did not "flee anywhere", but that his car was shot at "by automatic rifles" as he left Kyiv for Kharkiv "to meet the representatives of local parties" and he was then forced to move around Ukraine amid fears for the safety of himself and his family. He said "When we arrived in Kharkiv, on the early morning of 22 February, the security service started to receive information that radical groups were arriving in Kharkiv."

According to the Ukrainian State Border Service, Yanukovych tried to flee Ukraine via a charter flight from Donetsk, but was stopped by border guards. Both Putin and Yanukovych later stated that Russian forces helped Yanukovych fly to Russia on 24 February 2014.

Following his flight from Kyiv, protesters gained entry to Yanukovych's Mezhyhirya Residence, as police and security had abandoned their posts. Ukrainians were amazed at the opulence and extravagance of what they found at Mezhyhirya, including a private zoo, a fleet of cars, and a large boat.

On 26 February 2014, Russian media company RBC reported Yanukovych's presence in Moscow. According to RBC sources, Yanukovych arrived at the Radisson Royal Hotel, Moscow (often referred by its former name as "Hotel Ukraine") on the night of 25 February 2014. Then he moved to the Barvikha Sanatorium, the health resort of the President of Russia in Moscow Oblast. RosBusinessConsulting also reported sightings of Viktor Pshonka, a former Prosecutor General of Ukraine in the hall of Radisson Royal Hotel. The Press Secretary of the department that manages Barvikha Sanatorium denied the report, stating that he had no information of Yanukovych settled in Barvikha Sanatorium.

According to an April 2014 poll conducted by the Razumkov Centre, only 4.9% of respondents would have liked to see Yanukovych return to the presidency.

The EU association agreement was signed on 29 May 2014, after his removal.

Exile
According to Russian politician Oleg Mitvol, Yanukovych bought a house in Barvikha for $52 million on 26 February 2014.

On 27 February, a report stated that Yanukovych had asked the authorities of the Russian Federation to guarantee his personal security in the territory of Russia, a request that they accepted. Yanukovych claimed that the decisions of the Ukrainian parliament adopted "in the atmosphere of extremist threats" are unlawful and he remains the "legal president of Ukraine". He accused the opposition of violation of the 21 February agreements and asked the armed forces of Ukraine not to intervene in the crisis. The exact whereabouts of Yanukovych when he made this statement was unclear. In a June 2015 interview  with BBC's Newsnight he thanked Russian President Vladimir Putin for "saving his life".

In an April 2014 poll by Kyiv International Institute of Sociology those polled in southern and eastern Ukraine were generally split on the legitimacy of the then Yatsenyuk government and parliament, but a majority in all regions agreed that Yanukovych was not the legal president of the country.

On 3 October 2014, several news agencies reported that according to a Facebook post made by the aide to the Ukrainian Interior Minister, Anton Gerashchenko, Viktor Yanukovych had been granted Russian citizenship by a "secret decree" of Vladimir Putin. On the same day, Russian presidential spokesman Dmitry Peskov said that he didn't know anything about this.

On 26 November 2015, Yanukovych received a temporary asylum certificate in Russia for one year; later extended until November 2017. In October 2017, this was extended to another year. According to his lawyer Yanukovych did not consider acquiring Russian citizenship or a permanent residence permits but "Only a temporary shelter for returning to the territory of Ukraine". In 2017, Russian media suggested that Yanukovych is apparently living in Bakovka near Moscow, in a residence owned by Russian Ministry of Internal Affairs.

Position of Yanukovych on his removal
In a press conference in Rostov-on-Don on 28 February 2014, Yanukovych stated that all his possessions had been legally declared and accounted for. The same day Swiss and Austrian authorities blocked Yanukovych's and his associates' assets, and launched a corruption investigation.

Yanukovych said that an "armed coup" had taken place in Ukraine, and that he was still the legitimate president because there had been no impeachment, resignation, or death. On 11 March he claimed he should return to Ukraine as soon as this was possible.

Yanukovych stated he had been able to escape to Russia "thanks to patriotic officers who did their duty and helped me stay alive". In the press conference he stated that he was still President of Ukraine and "I can't find words to characterise this new authority. These are people who advocate violence – the Ukrainian parliament is illegitimate". He described the new Ukrainian authorities as "pro-fascist thugs" and that they "represent the absolute minority of the population of Ukraine".

He apologised to the Ukrainian people for not having "enough strength to keep stability" and for allowing "lawlessness in this country". He vowed to return to Ukraine "as soon as there are guarantees for my security and that of my family". He insisted he had not instructed Ukrainian forces to shoot at Euromaidan protesters.

He did not take part in the 2014 Ukrainian presidential election since he "believe[d] they are unlawful...". He said he was surprised ("knowing the character of Vladimir Vladimirovich Putin") by the silence of Russia's president, Vladimir Putin, on the events in Ukraine. He hoped to find out more on Russia's position when he meets with Mr. Putin "as soon as he has time".

The issue of Russian military intervention 2014
On 28 February 2014 Yanukovych claimed "eastern Ukraine will rise up as soon as they have to live without any means". On 28 February 2014 the BBC reported him as insisting that military action was "unacceptable" and as stating that he would not request Russian military intervention.

Russia's Permanent Representative to the United Nations Vitaly Churkin told the UN Security Council on 4 March 2014 that Yanukovych had asked Russia to send troops across the Russia–Ukraine border to protect civilians via a letter to Russian President Vladimir Putin on 1 March 2014. On 4 March 2014 Putin answered questions of reporters about the situation in Crimea. In this interview he claimed "if I do decide to use the Armed Forces, this will be a legitimate decision in full compliance with both general norms of international law, since we have the appeal of the legitimate President."

In an interview with the Associated Press and Russian channel NTV of 2 April 2014 Yanukovych called Russia's annexation of Crimea "a tragedy", the 2014 Crimean referendum "a form of protest" and he stated he hopes it will become part of Ukraine again. Yanukovych said he would try to persuade Russian President Vladimir Putin to return Crimea to Ukraine. He squarely blamed the Yatsenyuk Government and acting Ukrainian President Oleksandr Turchynov for Ukraine's loss of Crimea. He said he gave no orders to open fire on Euromaidan protesters.

Yanukovych said: "We must set such a task and search for ways to return to Crimea on any conditions, so that Crimea may have the maximum degree of independence possible... but be part of Ukraine."

March 2014 to December 2021
At a press-conference in Rostov-On-Don on 11 March 2014 Yanukovych asked the Ukrainian military to disobey the "criminal orders" of a "band of ultranationalists and neofascists". He called the 2014 Ukrainian presidential election illegal, as well as U.S. financial help, since US law allegedly did not allow the support of "bandits". Yanukovych stated he would like to ask the Western supporters of the Yatsenyuk Government that he referred to as "dark powers": "Have you become blind? Have you forgotten what fascism is?" alluding to the fact that several positions in the transitional government went to representatives of the right-wing extremist nationalist group Svoboda, condemned by the EU in 2012 (see Svoboda Party). Unlike his 28 February press conference, Yanukovych did not take questions from reporters.

On 28 March 2014, Yanukovych asked the Party of Regions to exclude him. He was excluded on 29 March during a party congress along with several senior figures of his régime.

On 13 April, Yanukovych again gave a press conference in Rostov-on-Don, this time accompanied by former Prosecutor General Viktor Pshonka and former interior minister Vitaliy Zakharchenko.

On 13 June 2014, Yanukovych released a video message in which he criticised Petro Poroshenko's handling of the unrest in eastern Ukraine, naming it "criminal orders to kill people...that causes anger and curse the mothers who see the death and suffering of their children". Russian media had previously reported that Yanukovych, along with his wife, had moved to Sochi.

On 21 February 2015, a year after the revolution, Yanukovych gave an interview to Channel One regarding the situation in Ukraine and promised to return to power as soon as he could.

On 18 June 2015, Yanukovych was officially deprived of the title of President of Ukraine.

On 22 June 2015, Yanukovych was interviewed on BBC Newsnight and he accepted some responsibility for the deaths just before his removal from power.

On 7 December 2015, Yanukovych announced his interest in returning to Ukrainian politics.

In a 22 February 2017, interview with Christopher Miller of Radio Free Europe, Konstantin Kilimnik explained the existence of a peace effort between Russia and Ukraine called the "Mariupol Plan" in which Viktor Yanukovych would return as president of Russia's illegally controlled regions and Crimea in Ukraine. Andriy Artemenko's peace plan was known as the "New initiative for Peace".

2022 Russian invasion of Ukraine
Russia launched a full-scale invasion of Ukraine on 24February 2022. On 2March, Ukrayinska Pravda reported that Ukrainian intelligence sources believed that Yanukovych was spotted in Minsk, Belarus and that it was Russia's intention to declare Yanukovych as President of Ukraine in the event of Russian forces gaining control of Kyiv.

According to Ukrayinska Pravda'''s sources Yanukovych left Minsk on 7 March 2022, and again he vanished from the public’s eye.

Russian forces never gained control over Kyiv since the Russian army abandoned its Kyiv offensive on 2 April 2022.

Criminal cases
Since the revolution, Yanukovych has been convicted in absentia of high treason against Ukraine. He is wanted by the Prosecutor General of Ukraine, charged with responsibility for mass murder of the Maidan protesters, as well as abuse of power, misappropriation of public funds, bribery, and property theft.

On 28 February 2014, the General Prosecutor of Ukraine, Oleh Makhnitsky, formally asked Russia to extradite Yanukovych. Russian prosecutors stated that they had not received such a request from Ukraine. To date, Russia has declined to extradite him. Due to the Crimean crisis he was put on the US sanction list on 17 March 2014, an action which had been already previously been considered.

Fraud
On 11 July 2005, the office of the Donetsk Oblast Prosecutor charged Yanukovych with fraud, stemming from alleged irregularities in the way his convictions were expunged twenty years earlier. In 2006, the General Prosecutor closed the case due to lack of evidence. In 2006, a criminal charge was filed for official falsifying of documents concerning the quashing of Yanukovych's prior convictions after it was discovered that two documents had been tampered with, including the forgery of a judge's signature in connection with one charge of battery.

On 29 January 2010, the Prosecutor General of Ukraine Oleksandr Medvedko claimed that Yanukovych had been unlawfully jailed in his youth.

Bribery
After the Euromaidan events the General Prosecutor opened at least four new criminal cases against the former president of Ukraine. This included multiple cash payments to a number of Ukraine's top officials which were investigated as suspected bribes. The payments totalled $2 billion over years, ranging from $500,000 to $20 million paid in cash, the recipients included "ministers, heads of agencies, Verkhovna Rada members, civic activists, representatives of international organizations, top judges, including those of the Supreme Administrative Court and the Constitutional Court, and the Central Election Commission".

Property theft through conspiracy
Yanukovych is also charged with property theft in a conspiracy with the chairman of the Nadra Ukrainy state company (Articles 109 and 209), which has been under investigation since March 2014.

Ukrtelekom case
On 30 September 2014, the General Prosecutor of Ukraine opened a new case against Yanukovych for using ₴220 million of state money to establish his own private communication company based on Ukrtelekom. The prosecutor's office also considered that Yanukovych was helped by former government officials Mykola Azarov (prime minister), Yuriy Kolobov (finance minister), Anatoliy Markovsky (first deputy minister of finance), Hennadiy Reznikov (director of Derzhspetszviazok), and Dzenyk (Ukrtelekom board of directors).

Kharkiv treaty

Beginning in the summer of 2014, the prosecutor's office investigated Yanukovych's signing of the Kharkiv treaty, which allowed the Black Sea Fleet to stay in Ukraine for an additional 25 years. Yanukovych is being charged with abuse of power (Article 364) and state treason (Article 111) that are being investigated since April 2014 as well as the new procedure on creation of criminal organization (Article 255) that is being investigated since the summer.

Mass murder at Maidan
A warrant for Yanukovych's arrest was issued on 24 February 2014 by the interim government, accusing him of responsibility for the mass murder of protesters. Acting Ukrainian Interior Minister Arsen Avakov declared that Yanukovych had been placed on Ukraine's most wanted list and that a criminal case for the mass killings of civilians had been opened against him.

Interpol
For several years, Interpol refused to place Viktor Yanukovych on the wanted list as a suspect by the new Ukrainian government for the mass killing of protesters during Euromaidan.

However, on 12 January 2015, Viktor Yanukovych was listed by Interpol as "wanted by the judicial authorities of Ukraine for prosecution / to serve a sentence" on charges of "misappropriation, embezzlement or conversion of property by malversation, if committed in respect of an especially gross amount, or by an organized group".Interpol announced search for Yanukovych, Azarov, and Co . Ukrinform. 12 January 2015

On 16 July 2015, some Russian media reported that Interpol had suspended its Red Notice for Yanukovych. According to the Ukrainian Interpol office, this was a temporary measure due to Yanukovych's complaints that the charges were politically motivated.

Interpol later confirmed that Yanukovych and Oleksandr Yanukovych were no longer subject to an Interpol red notice or diffusion, and that they are unknown on Interpol's databases. Interpol's action followed an application to Interpol by Joseph Hage Aaronson on behalf of Yanukovych seeking his removal from the Interpol wanted list, as according to the law firm, the criminal charges brought by the Ukrainian government against Yanukovych were "part of a pattern of political persecution of him." In 2017, Yanukovych's son was removed from Interpol's wanted list.

Treason
In November 2016, Prosecutor General Yuriy Lutsenko questioned Yanukovych via video link in connection with the former Berkut. During the questioning, Lutsenko told Yanukovych that he was being accused of treason.

On 14 March 2017, the Prosecutor General submitted to court documents of the Yanukovych's case on state treason. Yanukovych was charged with encroachment on the territorial integrity and inviolability of Ukraine, high treason, and complicity in aggressive warfare by the Russian Federation aimed at altering Ukraine's state borders.

More than 100 witnesses were interviewed for the case. One was Denis Voronenkov, who was shot dead in downtown Kyiv at the end of March 2017.

On 4 May 2017 the first preliminary session commenced in Kyiv's Obolonskyi District Court under Judge Vladyslav Devyatko. Yanukovych was not present and was tried in absentia. He testified via video link from Russia.

In closing arguments on 16 August, prosecutors Ruslan Kravchenko and Maksym Krym asked the court in Kyiv to sentence the former leader to 15 years in prison. The judge then adjourned the trial until 13 September.

However the former leader was hospitalized in Moscow days before he was scheduled to give the final statement. Yanukovych was taken to Moscow's Sklifosovsky Institute of Emergency Medicine by ambulance on 16 November in an immobilized condition. He allegedly sustained back and knee injuries while "playing tennis".

On 24 January 2019 a panel of three judges of the Obolonskyi District Court found Yanukovych guilty of high treason and complicity in Russian military intervention in Ukraine. They stated that "the court, having heard the testimony of witnesses, examined conclusions of experts, documents and material evidence, assessed the arguments of prosecution and defense, considers that the guilt of the accused in committing the crimes under Part 1 Article 111 (high treason), Part 5 Article 27, Part 2 Article 437 (complicity in conducting an aggressive war) of the Criminal Code of Ukraine is duly proved by relevant and admissible evidence". He was acquitted of the other charge relating to Ukraine's sovereignty and territorial integrity. The verdict was that Yanukovych was sentenced to 13 years of jail in absentia.

Academic degrees
The former president's official website stated that he graduated from Donetsk Polytechnic Institute with a major in Mechanical Engineering, holds a master's degree in International Law at the Ukrainian Academy of Foreign Trade and is a member of the Academy of Economic Sciences of Ukraine, PhD in economics.

According to the Russian website ua.spinform.ru, from December 2000 to February 2004, while in the position of Ukrainian Prime Minister, Yanukovych headed the Faculty of Innovative Management at the Donetsk State University of Management.

Yanukovych's curriculum vitae, published at website europarl.europa.eu, states he is a "Doctor of Economics, Professor, Full Member of the Academy of Economic Sciences of Ukraine, Member of the Presidium of the National Academy of Sciences in Ukraine."

Website Pravda.com.ua reported that Yanukovych received the honorary title of docent (lecturer) of the Faculty of Automobile Transport at the Donetsk State Academy of Administration, a tertiary education establishment that specialised in Economics and Management
Oleksandr Zakharov, who studied international law at the Academy of Foreign Trade at the same time as Yanukovych, contended that "individual study programs" such as Yanukovych's were commonly viewed as a diploma mill for state officials.

Awards and honors

Personal life

Yanukovych was married to Lyudmyla Oleksandrivna Nastenko. The couple married in 1971. With his wife Yanukovych had two sons, Oleksandr and Viktor, and three grandsons Viktor, Oleksandr and Iliya. From 2006 to 2014, the younger Viktor was a member of the Parliament of Ukraine; he died by drowning at Lake Baikal in 2015.

In February 2017, Yanukovych admitted that after 45 years of marriage he had divorced Lyudmyla. Ukrayinska Pravda claims that during the Yanukovych presidency, his wife Lyudmyla lived separately in Donetsk. After the start of the Russo-Ukrainian War she reportedly moved to Crimea.

Until 2004, Yanukovych was known as batia ("Dad") among his family members, but since that time he became "leader".. Pravda.com.ua. Yanukovych himself stated that his ex-wife did not wish for her grandson to pick up the bad habits of his grandfather, but Yanukovych did not specify what kind of habits those were.

In March 2012, Yanukovych stated it was "a problem" for him in 2002 to speak Ukrainian but that "once I had the opportunity to speak Ukrainian, I started to do it with pleasure".

Cultural and political image

Yanukovych was seen by opponents as representing the interests of Ukrainian big business; they pointed out that his campaigns benefited from backing by Ukrainian billionaire Rinat Akhmetov. Supporters of Yanukovych pointed out that the Donetsk Oblast secured unprecedented levels of investment during his time in office.

Yanukovych drew strong support from Russian-speaking Ukrainians in the east of the country. He is disliked and distrusted in western Ukraine. The People's Movement of Ukraine labeled his election on 10 February 2010 as "an attack by anti-Ukrainian forces on our state" and stated that "all possible legal means should be used to prevent the concentration of power in the hands of anti-state politician Yanukovych and his pro-Moscow retinue". On 16 February 2010, Yanukovych issued a statement that read: "I can say only one thing to those who anticipate that my presidency will weaken Ukraine – that will never happen." Yanukovych refers to himself as Ukrainian. Voters for Yanukovych in 2010 believed he would bring "stability and order". They blamed the Orange Revolution for creating broken promises, a dysfunctional economy and political chaos.Ukraine set for tilt to east as Russia's ally holds poll lead, The Guardian (7 February 2010) During the 2010 presidential election campaign Yuriy Yakymenko, director of political research at the Razumkov Centre, stated: "I think he has not just changed on the surface but also in his ideas."In 2004, Yanukovych was seen as outgoing President Leonid Kuchma and Russian President Vladimir Putin's protégé. Kuchma, however, in conversation with United States Ambassador to Ukraine John F. Tefft, in a document dated 2 February 2010 uncovered during the United States diplomatic cables leak, called the voters' choice between Yanukovych and Yulia Tymoshenko during the second round of the 2010 presidential election a choice between "bad and very bad" and praised Arseniy Yatsenyuk, the candidate eliminated in the first round of the election, instead. In another January 2009 cable then-Ambassador of Ukraine to Russia Kostyantyn Gryshchenko stated that Putin had a low personal regard for Yanukovych. In another Wikileaks diplomatic cable, Volodymyr Horbulin, one of Ukraine's most respected policy strategists and former presidential advisor to then-President Viktor Yushchenko, told the United States Ambassador to Ukraine John E. Herbst in 2006 that Yanukovych's Party of Regions was partly composed of "pure criminals" and "criminal and anti-democracy figures."

Yanukovych is not known as a great speaker. His native language is Russian, similar to a majority of the population of his power-base and native Eastern Ukraine. He, however, made efforts to speak better Ukrainian. He admitted in March 2012 that it was a problem for him in 2002 to speak Ukrainian. He has made some blunders, however, in Ukrainian since then.Tymoshenko slams Yanukovych's gift for gaffe, Kyiv Post (29 December 2009)  For the 2004 Ukrainian presidential election, Yanukovych wrote an autobiography for the Central Election Commission, in which he misspelled his academic degree. Thereafter, he came to be widely referred to with this nickname in opposition media and opponents' speeches. His autobiographic resume of 90 words contains 12 major spelling and grammatical errors. Opponents of Yanukovych made fun of this misspelling and his criminal convictions during the 2004 Ukrainian presidential election campaign and the incident during the campaign (September 2004) in Ivano-Frankivsk when Yanukovych was rushed to hospital after being hit by an egg (while government officials claimed he was hit by a brick) was a source of ridicule.

Other famous blunders by Yanukovych are his claim that Anton Chekhov was "a Ukrainian poet" in January 2010, forgetting on 6 January 2011 to congratulate the Greek-Catholic Ukrainian community, which, along with the rest of the Ukrainian people, celebrates Christmas that day, and confusing Kosovo with Serbia and Montenegro, and North Ossetia with South Ossetia in March 2010. Over the years, Yanukovych's proficiency in the Ukrainian language has noticeably improved (in a form filled in for the 2004 election he claimed to be fluent in Ukrainian, yet made in that very form a series of egregious mistakes, inter alia spelling his own wife's patronym incorrectly).

Yanukovych stated in November 2009 that he respects all Ukrainian politicians. "I have never offended anyone. This is my rule of politics." In spite of this claim, on 22 September 2007, during the 2007 Ukrainian parliamentary election campaign, while delivering a speech in Vinnytsia, he compared Yulia Tymoshenko's performance as Prime Minister to "a cow on ice", ("Вона прем'єр-міністр, як корова на льду....", "She is a prime minister like a cow on ice") most likely referring to her skills and professionalism as a prime minister.

Other cases of strong colloquialisms used by Yanukovych include the incident when he called former president Viktor Yushchenko "a coward and a babbler", as well as a speech in Donetsk during the 2004 Ukrainian presidential election, when he referred to the electorate of his opponent Yushchenko as "goats that make our lives difficult" ("эти козлы, которые нам мешают жить"). Later, during TV debates with Yushchenko he explained, "I called the traitors goats. According to the Bible, the goat is a traitor, and there are also rams, sheep." After his February 2014 escape to Russia, during his 28 February press conference in Rostov-on-Don, Yanukovych said, "Ukraine is our strategic partner" (misspeaking and confusing Ukraine with Russia). During the same press conference he also broke a pen in an emotional outburst, while trying to apologize to the Ukrainian people.

Opinion polls showed that Yanukovych's popularity sank after his election as president in 2010, with polls giving him from 13% to 20% of the votes if a presidential election were to be held in 2012 (in 2010 he received 35.8% of the vote in the first round of that election.)All In The Family, Kyiv Post (2 March 2012) Ratings of politicians , Sociological group "RATING"Electoral moods of the Ukrainian population: February 2012 , Sociological group "RATING" (5 March 2012) A public opinion poll taken by Sociological group "RATING" gave him 25.1% of the votes in an imaginary February 2013 presidential election.

The Ambassador of the European Union to Ukraine, José Manuel Pinto Teixeira, stated during an April 2012 interview with Korrespondent that Yanukovych's presidency "fell short of expectations".

In an overview piece in March 2013, The Ukrainian Week claimed that Yanukovych had "failed to meet" his 2010 election promises.

Manafort consultant
In December 2004 Yanukovych and his Party of Regions hired American political consultant Paul Manafort as an adviser. He continued to serve in that role through the February 2010 Ukrainian presidential election, even as the US government opposed Yanukovych. Manafort's task was to rehabilitate Yanukovych's political career in the aftermath of the Orange Revolution."Disturbing Role of American Consultants in Yanukovych’s Ukraine" , Freedom House (28 February 2014) According the Party of Regions' accounting book, Paul Manafort, who after the Orange Revolution provided strong support to Yanukovych, received funds from the Party of Regions via the Belize based Neocom Systems Limited's account at the Kyrgyzstan based Asia Universal Bank (AUB) on 14 October 2009.

Manafort hired the public relations firm Edelman to lift Yanukovych's public image. However, Manafort's friends have said that Yanukovych "stopped listening" to him after he became president in 2010; Manafort warned him of the consequences of "extreme" political measures.

Manafort would later go on to serve as campaign chairman for Donald Trump in 2016. The American FBI began a criminal investigation into Manafort's business dealings while he was lobbying for Yanukovych. American Federal prosecutors alleged that between 2010 and 2014 Manafort was paid more than $60 million by Ukrainian sponsors, including Rinat Akhmetov, believed to be the richest man in Ukraine.

In January 2019, Manafort resigned from the Connecticut bar.

See also

 2006 Ukrainian political crisis
 2007 Ukrainian political crisis
 2010 Ukrainian presidential election
 2014 Hrushevskoho Street riots
 Prelude to the 2022 Russian invasion of Ukraine
 Alliance of National Unity
 Party of Regions
 Mezhyhirya (residence)

Notes

References

Further reading
Yanukovych, Viktor F.: Opportunity Ukraine. Vienna 2011. (Mandelbaum Publishing).

External links

 Viktor Yanukovych, President of Ukraine – Archived contents from 9 February 2014
 Yanukovich.org — project created by electronic magazine politika.su where they collect information on Yanukovich after 21 February 2014
 "All power to councils – not to a President Czar"
 Viktor Yanukovych on Twitter
  
 Yanukovych’s inner circle – Kyiv Post'' (21 January 2010)
 Collected News and Articles at the Guardian
 yanukovychleaks.org – website dedicated to publishing documents recovered from Mezhyhirya
 Interview with BBC Newsnight of 22 June 2015
 

 
1950 births
Living people
Viktor
People from Yenakiieve
Donetsk National Technical University alumni
Fugitives wanted by Ukraine
Governors of Donetsk Oblast
Impeached presidents removed from office
Fugitives wanted on murder charges
Independent politicians in Ukraine
Communist Party of the Soviet Union members
Fifth convocation members of the Verkhovna Rada
Sixth convocation members of the Verkhovna Rada
Party of Regions politicians
People of the Orange Revolution
Presidents of Ukraine
Prime Ministers of Ukraine
Pro-government people of the Euromaidan
Ukrainian criminals
Ukrainian engineers
Ukrainian exiles
Exiled politicians
Ukrainian people of Belarusian descent
Ukrainian people of Russian descent
Russians in Ukraine
Presidents of the National Olympic Committee of Ukraine
2003 Tuzla Island conflict
Candidates in the 2004 Ukrainian presidential election
Candidates in the 2010 Ukrainian presidential election
Recipients of the Presidential Order of Excellence
Recipients of the Olympic Order
Treason in Ukraine
Ukrainian politicians convicted of crimes
Ukrainian collaborators with Russia
Russian individuals subject to European Union sanctions
Russian individuals subject to the U.S. Department of the Treasury sanctions
Grand Croix of the Légion d'honneur
Recipients of the Order of Holy Prince Daniel of Moscow
Recipients of the Order of Merit (Ukraine), 1st class
Recipients of the Order of St. Vladimir, 1st class
Recipients of the Heydar Aliyev Order
Recipients of the Honorary Diploma of the Cabinet of Ministers of Ukraine
Recipients of the Order of Merit (Ukraine), 2nd class
Recipients of the Order of Merit (Ukraine), 3rd class
Specially Designated Nationals and Blocked Persons List